Planet Dream is an album by American jazz trombonist Steve Swell which was recorded in 2008 and released on the Portuguese Clean Feed label. He leads a trio with Rob Brown on alto sax and Daniel Levin on cello.

Background
Brown and Swell are long-time members of William Parker's Little Huey Creative Music Orchestra. They have also worked in smaller groups on the albums We Are Not Obstinate Islands by The Diplomats, a collaborative trio with drummer Harris Eisenstadt, and Radiant Pools, under Brown's leadership. Levin and Brown have worked in a trio with drummer Satoshi Takeishi, which recorded Sounds.

Reception
In a double review for All About Jazz, Wilbur Mackenzie states "Swell has worked with cellist Dan Levin and saxophonist Rob Brown before in various contexts, but a tightly woven trio environment provides for a very exposed look at how three distinct identities can contribute to a meaningful whole while maintaining individual directionality."

Track listing
All compositions by Swell / Brown / Levin except as indicated
 "Out of the Box" – 5:20
 "Not Necessarily This, Nor That" (Steve Swell) – 8:52 
 "Planet Dream" – 4:05
 "Juxtsuppose" (Steve Swell) – 5:07
 "#2 of Nine" – 4:26
 "Airtight" (Steve Swell) – 5:51 
 "And Then They Wept" – 4:59
 "City Life" – 4:38
 "Texture #2" (Steve Swell) – 9:13

Personnel
Steve Swell – trombone
Rob Brown – alto sax
Daniel Levin - cello

References

2009 albums
Steve Swell albums
Clean Feed Records albums